The Sega SG-1000 had 74 games and 29 programs released. Additionally, there are 12 games and 19 programs released by John Sands Electronics.

List of SG-1000/SC-3000 series games
Sega SG-1000/SC-3000 series Cartridge Game  List

Sega SG-1000/SC-3000 series MYCARD Game List

A 'Card Catcher' is an adapter to use card software. It is inserted into the Cartridge Slot.
Because there is no card slot on the SG-1000/SC-3000 series, or the Mark II it is a necessary adapter (a card slot is built into the SEGA Mark III/Master System).
A 'Card Catcher' attached version existed in the first
limited edition of Dragon-Wang and ZOOM-909.

Othello Multivision Cartridge List

The Othello Multivision is a licensed clone of the SG-1000, manufactured by Tsukuda Original and fully compatible with the SG-1000.  The console comes with a copy of the game Reversi built into the unit, and eight additional titles were released by Tsukuda Original.

Sega CAI Software(for SC-3000 series or SG-1000 series + SK-1100)

BASIC cartridge

Other

The drawing/painting program TV Oekaki (Eng. trans.: "TV Doodler" or "TV Scribbler") uses a drawing tablet that connects directly to the cartridge.

John Sands Electronics SC-3000 Casettes List

References

External links
GameFAQs page on SG-1000

SG-1000